A Migrant Resource Centre or MRC is an Australian community-based organisation  that provides settlement services for migrants and refugees. The main purpose of MRCs is to cater to the immediate and longer term needs of migrants and refugees to facilitate successful integration into their local community and enable them to reach their full potential. MRC's provide information and referral services and assistance with finding and keeping employment to newly arrived migrants and refugees. MRCs also provide services for aged and disabled members of ethnic communities who prefer to access ethno-specific services. Many MRCs also conduct research and consultancy on a range of cultural and community issues.

MRCs are limited by the terms of their funding and can only provide services to holders of certain categories of visa that allow them to access their services. Most asylum seekers are ineligible to access these services, along with most other government health, housing, community or employment services. There are a small number of specialist asylum seeker services that have been set up to cater to the needs of these highly marginalised people.

See also 
 Immigration
 Immigration to Australia
 Multiculturalism
 Human Rights

External links 
 Spectrum Migrant Resource Centre, Preston, Victoria Australia
 MRC North West Region, Victoria, Australia
 MRC Northern Tasmania, Australia
 Liverpool MRC, NSW, Australia
 Northern Settlement Services, NSW Australia
 Southern MRC, Dandenong, Victoria, Australia
 Migrants Resource Centre, UK
 New Hope Migrant & Refugee Centre, formerly South Central Region Migrant Resource Centre, Victoria, Australia
 Migrant Resource Centre, Southern Tasmania, Australia

Human migration